Sajjana (original name Sajjan) is a village in Hoshiarpur tehsil of Hoshiarpur district in Punjab, India.

Location 
It is situated 7 km away from district headquarters Hoshiarpur on the Hoshiarpur-Dasuya road also known as State highway 24. From the other side Sajjana connects to state highway 22 which links Hoshiarpur with Tanda.

Population and Area 
Sajjana has a total population of 411 people. There are about 86 houses in Sajjana village. The total geographical area of village is 124 hectares. The North-West and East part of Sajjana village consist of farm lands. The Village is surrounded by choes from both Northern and Southern side in which water flows along with sand whenever there is heavy rainfall in nearby mountains.

Panchayat 

Sajjana village is itself a gram panchayat. The current sarpanch is Parvinder Singh. He along with 5 other panchs looks after the development of the village.

Education 

Sajjana village has its own Government primary school for children aged 5 to 11.

Religious Places 

Gurudwara Singh Sabha Village Sajjan

This Gurudwara is situated in the center of the village. Gurbani From Shri Guru Granth Sahib ji is recited here in the morning and evening. Gurudwara sahib has a very tall hydraulic 'Nishan Sahib' which is washed with Water and Milk every year on occasion of Vaisakhi. Every religious festival of Sikh Religion is Celebrated here. Some of them are :
 Gurupurab of Shri Guru Gobind Singh ji.
 Gurupurab of Shri Guru Nanak Dev ji.
 Shaheedi divas of Guru Arjun Dev ji.
 Vaisakhi celebration.

Baba Dittu Ram Ji Temple

It is a Historical Holy temple situated in Village Sajjan. Baba Dittu Ram ji Once lived here. Every year Langar is distributed here on the eve of Shivratri. Kheer-pude is widely used here in Langar.

References

Villages in Hoshiarpur district